"Freak" is the debut single by the English rock singer-songwriter and bass guitarist Bruce Foxton, which became a hit and one of his most recognizable songs. It was released on 30 July 1983, as the lead single from his debut studio album, Touch Sensitive. It was inspired strongly by the 1980 biographical film The Elephant Man, with the single's cover even referencing the film's posters.

It was one of four tracks from the album that were produced by the multiple-award winning Steve Lillywhite. The song is notably Foxton's only single to make the Top 40 in the United Kingdom, peaking at 23, for a total of five weeks.

Personnel
Credits are adapted from the single's back cover.
 Bruce Foxton – lead vocals, bass guitar
 Pete Glenister – guitars
 Adrian Lillywhite – drums
 Anthony Thistlethwaite – saxophone
 Roddy Lorimer – trumpet
 Jackie Challenor – backing vocals
 Lorenza Johnson – backing vocals
 Mae McKenna – backing vocals

Chart performance

References

External links
 

1983 debut singles
Song recordings produced by Steve Lillywhite
1983 songs
Songs written by Bruce Foxton
Arista Records singles